Willi Fick (17 February 1891 – 5 September 1913) was a German international footballer who played for Holstein Kiel. He also won one cap for the German national team in 1910.

References

External links
 

1891 births
1913 deaths
Association football forwards
German footballers
Germany international footballers
Holstein Kiel players
Footballers from Hamburg